885 Ulrike (prov. designation:  or ) is an elongated Themistian asteroid from the outer regions of the asteroid belt. It was discovered on 23 September 1917, by Soviet astronomer Sergey Belyavsky at the Simeiz Observatory on the Crimean peninsula. It was likely named after Ulrike von Levetzow, last love of Goethe.

Orbit and classification 

When applying the synthetic hierarchical clustering method (HCM) by Zappalà, Milani and Knežević (AstDys), Ulrike is a core member of the Themis family, a large asteroid family of carbonaceous asteroids named after 24 Themis. However, according to another HCM-analysis by Nesvorný, it is a background asteroid. It orbits the Sun in the outer main-belt at a distance of 2.5–3.7 AU once every 5 years and 5 months (1,992 days; semi-major axis of 3.1 AU). Its orbit has an eccentricity of 0.19 and an inclination of 3° with respect to the ecliptic. The asteroid was first observed at Lowell Observatory in August 1906. The body's observation arc begins at Heidelberg Observatory on 27 September 1906, more than a decade prior to its official discovery observation at Simeiz.

Naming 

This minor planet was allegedly named after Ulrike von Levetzow (1804–1899), a friend and last love of the German poet Johann Wolfgang von Goethe, who met Ulrike during summertime 1821–1823 in Marienbad, Bohemia. After she declined to marry him, Goethe started writing Marienbad Elegy, one of his finest poems. Lutz Schmadel, the author of the Dictionary of Minor Planet Names, considers this interpretation the most likely because the discoverer, who studied at Göttingen University, was an expert in German literature.

Physical characteristics 

Ulrike spectral type is unknown. It is an assumed carbonaceous C-type asteroid, which agrees with the overall spectral type assigned to members of the Themis family.

Rotation period 

In September 2010, a rotational lightcurve of Ulrike was obtained from photometric observations by John Menke at the Menke Observatory. Lightcurve analysis gave a rotation period of  hours with a high brightness variation of  magnitude, indicative of an elongated shape.

Diameter and albedo 

The Collaborative Asteroid Lightcurve Link adopts the results from IRAS, that is an albedo of 0.083 and a diameter of 33.43 kilometers based on an absolute magnitude of 10.7.

References

External links 
 Lightcurve Database Query (LCDB), at www.minorplanet.info
 Dictionary of Minor Planet Names, Google books
 Asteroids and comets rotation curves, CdR – Geneva Observatory, Raoul Behrend
 Discovery Circumstances: Numbered Minor Planets (1)-(5000) – Minor Planet Center
 
 

000885
000885
Discoveries by Sergei Belyavsky
Named minor planets
Giuseppe Verdi
19170923